Richard Snowden may refer to:

Richard Snowden (ironmaster) (1688–1763), American ironmaster
Richard Snowden (judge) (born 1962), British judge
Richard Snowden Andrews (1830–1903), American architect and Confederate artillery commander